Doomsday Warrior is a series of science fiction short novels set in 2089 and later, depicting the struggle to reclaim America from the USSR, after a nuclear strike and invasion in 1989 (the first book was written in 1984). The author, Ryder Stacy, is a pseudonym shared by Jan Stacy and Ryder Syvertsen. The series was published as part of the Zebra Books Men's Adventure series.

List of novels
 Doomsday Warrior (1984)
 Red America (1984)
 The Last American (1984)
 Bloody America (1985)
 America's Last Declaration (1985)
 American Rebellion (1985)
 American Defiance (1986)
 American Glory (1986)
 America's Zero Hour (1986)
 America's Nightmare
 America's Eden (1987)
 Death, American Style
 American Paradise (1988)
 American Death Orbit (1988)
 American Ultimatum (1989)
 American Overthrow (1989)
 America's Sword (1990)
 American Dream Machine (1990)
 America's Final Defense (1991)

References

External links
 GraphicAudio Books - dramatized audio adaptations of Doomsday Warrior

Science fiction book series
Post-apocalyptic novels
Works published under a pseudonym
Zebra Books books